Lee Hae-gon (born 8 October 1953) is a South Korean retired para table tennis player. He has medalled at every Paralympic Games from 1988 to 2008, for a total of seven gold, one silver, and four bronze medals.

Lee, the seventh of eight children in a poor family, enlisted in the Republic of Korea Marine Corps in 1971. The Marine Corps had created a special force to infiltrate North Korea following the Blue House raid, and Lee and other recruits underwent harsh training in Manisan. During one night training session in July 1973, he fell off a cliff and sustained a spinal cord injury. He spent six years in bed, before a missionary persuaded him to try table tennis for rehabilitation.

References

1953 births
Living people
Table tennis players at the 1988 Summer Paralympics
Table tennis players at the 1992 Summer Paralympics
Table tennis players at the 1996 Summer Paralympics
Table tennis players at the 2000 Summer Paralympics
Table tennis players at the 2004 Summer Paralympics
Table tennis players at the 2008 Summer Paralympics
Medalists at the 1988 Summer Paralympics
Medalists at the 1992 Summer Paralympics
Medalists at the 1996 Summer Paralympics
Medalists at the 2000 Summer Paralympics
Medalists at the 2004 Summer Paralympics
Medalists at the 2008 Summer Paralympics
South Korean male table tennis players
Paralympic bronze medalists for South Korea
Paralympic silver medalists for South Korea
Paralympic gold medalists for South Korea
Paralympic table tennis players of South Korea
Paralympic medalists in table tennis
People with paraplegia
People from Anyang, Gyeonggi
Sportspeople from Gyeonggi Province
FESPIC Games competitors